William Newton Collins (born May 21, 1894) was an American football and basketball coach and college athletics administrator.  He served as the head football coach at Missouri Wesleyan College in Cameron, Missouri from 1923 to 1925 and William Jewell College in Liberty, Missouri from 1927 to 1932. Collins was also the head basketball coach at William Jewell from 1928 to 1933, tallying a mark of 50–35.

Collins played college football as a halfback at the University of Missouri from 1916 to 1919. In 1920, he coached Missouri's freshman football team. The following year, Collins was the football coach at Liberty High School in Liberty. After two years at Liberty High School, Collins was appointed athletic director and head football coach at Missouri Wesleyan, succeeding Earl A. Davis.

Head coaching record

College football

References

1894 births
Year of death missing
American football halfbacks
Missouri Tigers football coaches
Missouri Tigers football players
Missouri Wesleyan Owls athletic directors
Missouri Wesleyan Owls football coaches
William Jewell Cardinals football coaches
William Jewell Cardinals men's basketball coaches
High school football coaches in Missouri
People from Clinton County, Missouri
Coaches of American football from  Missouri
Players of American football from  Missouri
Basketball coaches from Missouri